DARDO ("Dart" in Italian) is a close-in weapon system (CIWS) built by the Italian companies Breda and Oto Melara. It is composed of two Breda-built Bofors 40 mm firing high explosive (HE) shells, a fire-control radar (RTN-10X) and a fire-control system (RTN-20X and Dardo). It is the last of a long series of Italian anti-aircraft weapons derived from the Swedish Bofors 40 mm autocannons (mounted on Breda built gun mounts such as the Type 64, Type 106, Type 107, Type 564 and Type 520).

Purpose
The system's primary purpose is to defend against anti-ship missiles, unmanned aerial vehicles and other precision guided weapons. It can also be employed against conventional and rotary-wing aircraft, surface ships, small water-crafts, coastal targets and floating mines.

Installation
DARDO is installed in an enclosed turret with two different mounts: the Type A with 440-round internal and 292-round under-deck magazines; and Type B with only the 440-round internal magazine (Type B requires no deck penetration).

Other versions
The Fast Forty is an improved version of the system with a higher rate of fire, dual magazine and dual feed mechanism to allow switching from HE to armour-piercing fin-stabilized discarding sabot (APFSDS) rounds when a missile gets within 1,000 meters from the vessel.

Comparison with current CIWS

Operators

Current operators

 

 
 video
 

 

 

 
 

Vittorio Veneto-class cruiser
Giuseppe Garibaldi-class aircraft carrier

Carvajal-class frigate

See also
Aselsan GOKDENIZ
Myriad CIWS

References

External links

 OTO-Melara 40 mm weapon factsheets
 Data and Spec of OtoBreda DARDO
 Images of DARDO and other Breda 40 mm CIWS
 Video of DARDO firing

40 mm artillery
Autocannon
Close-in weapon systems
Naval anti-aircraft guns
Naval guns of Italy